Lake Nepahwin is a lake in Sudbury, Ontario, located to the south of the city's downtown area.

Origin of the name

Its name is derived from an old native term meaning "sleeping lake". It was adopted on August 4, 1949 following a community plebiscite.

See also
List of lakes in Ontario

References

Hallman, A., Nepahwin Lake Watershed: Its past, present, and future, Co-operative Freshwater Ecology Unit, Laurentian University, 1996

Nepahwin